Cocoa may refer to:

Chocolate
 Chocolate
 Theobroma cacao, the cocoa tree
 Cocoa bean, seed of Theobroma cacao
 Chocolate liquor, or cocoa liquor, pure, liquid chocolate extracted from the cocoa bean, including both cocoa butter and cocoa solids
 Cocoa butter, a pale yellow, edible fat extracted from the cocoa bean
 Cocoa solids or cocoa powder
 Hot chocolate, also called hot cocoa
 Cocoa Mountain, a gourmet chocolate enterprise in Durness in the North West Highlands of Scotland
 Cocoa Processing Company, a Ghanaian company

Computing
 Cocoa (API), an API and programming environment for macOS
 Cocoa Touch, an API and programming environment for iOS, iPadOS, watchOS and tvOS
 CoCoA, a computer algebra system
 COCOA (digital humanities), an early FORTRAN program for generating concordances and word counts from natural language texts
 Stagecast Creator, formerly Cocoa, a language developed by Apple to teach programming to children

Given name

 Cocoa Brown (born 1972), American actress
Cocoa Chanelle (born 1971), American DJ
 Cocoa Fujiwara (1983-2015), Japanese manga artist
 Cocoa Samoa (1945-2007), American-Samoan male professional wrestler
 Cocoa Tea (born 1959), Jamaican singer

Other uses
 Cocoa, Florida, a town in the US
 Cocoa Beach, Florida, a neighboring town
 Cocoa brown, a version of the color chocolate
 Cocoa (Is the Order a Rabbit?), a character in the manga series Is the Order a Rabbit?
 COVID-19 Contact-Confirming Application, often abbreviated as COCOA, Japanese COVID-19 contact tracing app

See also
 Cacao (disambiguation)
 Coca
 Coco (disambiguation)
 Co-Co (disambiguation)
 Cocoa Exchange (disambiguation)
 Koko (disambiguation)